Island Wedge Tomb is a wedge-shaped gallery grave and National Monument located southeast of Mallow in County Cork, Ireland.

Location
Island Wedge Tomb is located 9.3 km (5.8 mi) southeast of Mallow.

History

Wedge tombs of this kind were built in Ireland in the late Neolithic and early Bronze Age, c. 2500–2000 BC. Carbon-14 dating indicated activity in the time range of 1412–1308 BC and suggested that the gallery and outer wall were constructed in Early Bronze Age, with later enhancements. Evidence of cremated burial was found in several areas of the main chamber, as well as worked flint and scrapers. Also found were a spindle whorl and two glass beads. Three lots of cremated bone were found in the chamber but two were too small for meaningful interpretation. The third, in a pit towards the rear, was probably a 60-70-year-old female.

The tomb was excavated and partially restored in 1957. Some cremated bones were found during the excavation, located towards the end of the gallery.

Description
The gallery of this tomb is oriented SW–NE. It has double walls and an entrance marked with two large orthostats.

References

National Monuments in County Cork
Archaeological sites in County Cork